Alyssa Michelle Stephens (born December 22, 1998), professionally known as Latto or Big Latto (formerly known as Mulatto), is an American rapper and singer. She first appeared on American rapper Jermaine Dupri's reality television series The Rap Game in 2016, where she was known as Miss Mulatto and won the show's first season, but she rejected the record deal offered as a result of winning the show.

After releasing her 2019 single "Bitch from da Souf", Latto signed with RCA Records. The song entered the Billboard Hot 100 in August 2020, peaking at number 95. It was accompanied by a remix with rappers Saweetie and Trina. In 2020, Latto released the follow-up single "Muwop" (featuring Gucci Mane). Both songs were certified platinum and appeared on Latto's debut album Queen of da Souf, which was released in August 2020. Latto's mainstream breakthrough came with the release of "Big Energy", the lead single from her second studio album 777 (2022). Latto's highest-charting single to date, the song peaked at number three on the Billboard Hot 100.

Latto received nominations for Best New Hip Hop Artist at the 2020 BET Hip Hop Awards and Top Rap Female Artist at the 2022 Billboard Music Awards. She was a part of the XXL Freshman Class in 2020. She was named MTV Global's Push Artist of the Month in February 2021, and won the BET Award for Best New Artist in 2022. Latto received nominations for Best New Artist, Video For Good, and Best Hip Hop at the 2022 MTV Video Music Awards. "Big Energy" won Song of the Year, and 777 was nominated for Hip Hop Album of the Year at the 2022 BET Hip Hop Awards.  She was nominated for Best New Artist at the 2023 Grammy Awards.

Early life 
Alyssa Michelle Stephens was born in Columbus, Ohio, on December 22, 1998, to Misti Pitts and Shayne Stephens. She attended Lovejoy High School in Clayton County, Georgia. She credits Clayton County as the place that gave her street credibility. Her mother is white and her biological father is African American. Stephens was bullied in school for being "light-skinned" which inspired her to later adopt the stage name Miss Mulatto when she began her rapping career, after the "mulatto" racial classification. At the age of ten, Stephens decided to become a rapper and began writing her own rap songs. Prior to doing music, she participated in drag racing.

Career

2016–2018: Career beginnings and The Rap Game
In 2016, Stephens became a contestant on the Lifetime reality series The Rap Game, produced by Jermaine Dupri and Queen Latifah. The boot camp-style series followed young aspiring rappers in a competition against one another over a span of eight weeks. Latto, under the stage name "Miss Mulatto" at the time, was the overall winner of the competition. She was offered a recording contract from Dupri with So So Def Records but ultimately turned down the deal claiming it was not enough money, opting to be an independent artist.

Stephens' second mixtape, Latto Let 'Em Know, was released in April 2017. The tape featured artists like Molly Brazy, Lil Key, Crucial, and Silentó. The single "Response Diss" is a diss song directed toward Young Lyric, a fellow competitor from The Rap Game. The ongoing feud between the two resulted in diss tracks from both parties with insults about drug use, homosexuality, and past experiences from the show.

2019–2020: Breakthrough and Queen of Da Souf
In January 2019, Latto released the song "Bitch from da Souf". In May 2019, she was invited to perform at the Rolling Loud, an annual hip hop festival, located in Miami, Florida. In June 2019, she released her second extended play, titled Big Latto, which was preceded by "Bitch from da Souf". The single became her breakout hit, peaking at number 95 on the Billboard Hot 100 chart, and was certified gold by the Recording Industry Association of America (RIAA) in the United States. The song later received a remix, featuring rappers Saweetie and Trina, which was later included on Mulatto's third EP, Hit the Latto, which was released on December 12.

In March 2020, it was officially announced that Latto had signed with RCA Records. On April 23, Latto released the promotional single, "No Hook". On May 21, she released the second promotional single, "He Say She Say". In July 2020, Latto recreated some of rapper Gucci Mane's album covers, starting with 2009 The State vs. Radric Davis, to which Gucci reacted positively. Latto then revealed the release of her single "Muwop", featuring Gucci Mane, which was released on July 30. The song samples Gucci's 2007's single, "Freaky Gurl". Latto made a cameo appearance in American rapper Cardi B's music video for her single "WAP", which was released on August 7, 2020. On the same day, Latto was featured on NLE Choppa's single "Make Em Say", taken from his debut studio album, Top Shotta. On August 11, Latto was included on XXLs 2020 Freshman Class.

On August 12, Latto announced the release of her debut project through RCA, titled Queen of da Souf; it was released on August 21, 2020. The project was preceded by two singles, which were the remix to "Bitch from da Souf" and "Muwop" featuring Gucci Mane; as well as the promotional singles "No Hook" and "He Say She Say". The album peaked at number 44 on the US Billboard 200.

On September 4, Latto was featured on the remix of the Chloe x Halle song "Do It", alongside Doja Cat and City Girls. The same day, Latto was also featured on G-Eazy's single, "Down". Music videos for the third and fourth singles from Queen of da Souf, "On God" and "In n Out" featuring City Girls, were released in September and October 2020, respectively. On September 29, it was announced that she had been nominated for Best New Hip Hop Artist at the 2020 BET Hip Hop Awards, where she was also a performer. On December 11, Mulatto released the extended version of Queen of da Souf, which included five new songs and spawned the single "Sex Lies", featuring American rapper Lil Baby.

2021-present: Name change and 777
In January 2021, it was announced that Latto would be changing her stage name from "Mulatto" following the controversy of the term being deemed as colorist.

In February 2021, it was announced that Latto would be named MTV's Global Push Artist of the month. In March 2021, she became the first female rapper from Atlanta to have a solo record be certified gold and platinum with "Bitch from da Souf" (2019) and "Muwop" (2020).

In May 2021, she confirmed in various interviews that she had officially settled on a new stage name, following scrutiny for the racially charged nature of her name. On May 18, it was reported that on streaming platforms, Mulatto's name had been changed to simply Latto, a change first reflected on her guest appearance on Toosii's album Thank You for Believing, where she was credited as Latto. She released a new single titled "The Biggest", to go with the announcement of her new name.

On September 24, Latto released the lead single from her upcoming second studio album, "Big Energy". The song became Latto's highest charting song on the Billboard Hot 100, so far peaking at number three. American singer Mariah Carey appeared on the official remix, which was released in March 2022. A followup single, "Soufside", was released on November 5. On March 9, 2022, Latto announced that the song "Wheelie" would be released on March 11, and confirmed it would feature fellow Atlanta rapper 21 Savage. All three songs were included on Latto's second studio album, 777, which was released on March 25. On July 15, 2022, she released the song "Pussy". Latto was featured on Chloe Bailey's single "For the Night".

In February 2023, Latto was nominated for Best New Artist at the Grammy Awards. On February 17, 2023, Latto released her new single "Lottery".

Philanthropy 
In 2021, Latto founded the Win Some Give Some Foundation to “to empower at-risk young women by providing them resources and support to achieve a lifetime of success.”

Personal life 
In 2017, Latto opened her own store, Pittstop Clothing, in Jonesboro, Georgia.

In May 2019, Latto was arrested for theft when she was mistaken for another woman. She released a track, "Fuck Rice Street", attesting to her innocence and anger toward the police.

Filmography

Discography 

 Queen of da Souf (2020)
 777  (2022)

Awards and nominations

Other honors 
 2021 - MTV Global Push Artist of the Month (February)
 2022 - Variety Breakthrough Artist

Tours 
Headlining
Big Latto Tour (2019)
777 Tour (2022)

Supporting
 Lizzo – The Special Tour (2022-2023)

References

1998 births
Living people
American women rappers
African-American women rappers
Southern hip hop musicians
Rappers from Atlanta
21st-century American rappers
21st-century American women musicians
Songwriters from Ohio
Songwriters from Georgia (U.S. state)
21st-century African-American women
American women musicians of Indian descent
American people of Irish descent
American people of German descent
American people of Welsh descent
Trap musicians
Hardcore hip hop artists
Pop rappers
Rappers from Ohio
People from Jonesboro, Georgia
African-American women songwriters
21st-century women rappers